Surya Wonowidjojo (15 August 1923 – 28 August 1985) was an Indonesian businessman and cigarette maker.

He was the founder of Gudang Garam, a major Indonesian kretek (clove cigarette) manufacturer, and father of billionaire Rachman Halim.

Wonowidjojo's family first migrated to Sampang, Madura when Surya was four years old.  When his father died, he moved to Kediri, East Java where he worked for his uncle who was a kretek manufacturer.

Wonowidjojo founded Gudang Garam in Kediri in 1958 and headed the company until handing control to his son in 1984.

Wonowidjojo died on 28 August 1985 in Auckland, New Zealand.

Notes

Wonowidjojo family
1923 births
1985 deaths
Chinese emigrants to Indonesia
20th-century Indonesian businesspeople
Businesspeople from Fuzhou
People from Fuqing